Eliyahu Revivo (born 1973) is an Israeli politician and Likud activist.

Biography 
Revivo was born in 1973 to Yaakov and Esther. He has been an activist for the Likud party since the 1996 election. Revivo also worked for the city of Lod until retiring due to his brother Yair being elected Mayor of Lod in 2013.

Revivo ran in a primary to represent the 19th spot on the Likud's 2022 electoral list, which the party reserves for a resident of the Shephelah. After receiving support from former mayor of Lod Pinhas Idan, Revivo won 48% of the vote, defeating Benjamin Netanyahu's former Chief of staff David Sharon and member of the Rehovot City Council Guy Tsur.

Personal life 
Revivo resides in Gedera. He is married to Miri and has three children.

References 

1973 births
Living people
Israeli company founders
Jewish Israeli politicians
Likud politicians
Members of the 25th Knesset (2022–)
People from Gedera